Sadashiv may refer to:

Anant Sadashiv Altekar (1898–1960), historian, archaeologist, and numismatist from Maharashtra, India
Sadashiv Amrapurkar (1950–2014), Indian actor, best known in Marathi and Hindi films during 1983 to 1999
Sadashiv Rao Bhau (1730–1761), son of Chimaji Appa and Rakhmabai and the nephew of Peshwa Baji Rao I
Sadashiv Datar (born 1885), Indian long-distance runner
Govind Sadashiv Ghurye (1893–1983), Indian professor of sociology
Madhav Sadashiv Golwalkar, the second Sarsanghchalak of the Rashtriya Swayamsevak Sangh
Sadashiv Vasantrao Gorakshkar, Indian writer, art critic, museologist
Madhav Sadashiv Gore (1921–2010), Indian social scientist, writer, vice-chancellor of Jawaharlal Nehru University, Delhi
Narayan Sadashiv Hosmane, Indian-born cancer research scientist, research professor of Chemistry and Biochemistry
Sadashiv Iyer (born 1972), Indian former first class cricketer
Pandurang Sadashiv Khankhoje (1884–1967), Indian revolutionary, scholar, agricultural scientist and historian
Vishnu Sadashiv Kokje, the Governor of Himachal Pradesh, India, from 2003 to 2008
Sadashiv Lokhande, member of the 16th Lok Sabha of India
Sadashiv Kanoji Patil (1898–1981), former Congress leader from Maharashtra
Sadashiv Patil (born 1933), former Indian cricketer
Anant Sadashiv Patwardhan, Indian politician from the state of the Madhya Pradesh
Vasant Sadashiv Pradhan (1914–2002), Bharatiya Jan Sangh politician from Madhya Pradesh
Karnad Sadashiv Rao (1881–1937), Indian freedom fighter from Karnataka, India
Malhar Sadashiv (1912–1997), Indian industrialist
Pandurang Sadashiv Sane (1899–1950), Marathi author, teacher, social activist and freedom fighter
Sadashiv Shinde (1923–1955), Indian cricketer
Bhaskar Sadashiv Soman (born 1913 in Gwalior), Indian naval officer in command of the Indian Navy 1962–1966

See also
Sadashiv Pethi literature, term used to criticize mainstream Marathi literature
Sadashiv Peth, Pune, area located in Pune City, in Maharashtra State, India
Ekta Jeev Sadashiv, 1972 Marathi film directed by Govind Kulkarni and starring Dada Kondke and Usha Chavan
Sadashivgad